Jody Rigby is an Australian horticulturist and television personality, often appearing on gardening programs.

Career
Rigby began her television career on the Nine Network's Backyard Blitz in 2000, where she remained until the show finished in early 2008. The show was popular and it won six Logies. In 2008, she moved to the Seven Network to appear on The Outdoor Room, along with Jamie Durie, who also was a part of Backyard Blitz. In 2009 she hosted Garden Angels alongside Melissa King and Linda Ross on Foxtel's Lifestyle channel.

Rigby appeared on the cover of Ralph magazine in September 2004. She released a book, 150 Indestructible Plants, in 2010.

References

External links

Australian gardeners
Australian horticulturists
Australian television presenters
Australian women television presenters
Living people
1976 births